Derek MacKenzie (born June 11, 1981) is a Canadian former professional ice hockey player who most notably played for the Atlanta Thrashers, Columbus Blue Jackets and the Florida Panthers of the National Hockey League (NHL). He was drafted 128th overall by the Atlanta Thrashers in the 1999 NHL Entry Draft. He also played in the American Hockey League (AHL) for Columbus' and Atlanta's farm teams, the Syracuse Crunch and Chicago Wolves respectively. While with the Wolves, MacKenzie was part of a Calder Cup championship team in 2002 and also spent time as the team's captain. He set franchise records in career shorthanded goals for both AHL teams. His father, Ken MacKenzie, is the assistant general manager of the Ontario Hockey League's Sudbury Wolves. He is served as an assistant coach for the Florida Panthers until the 2021-2022
NHL season, whom he previously served as captain of from 2016 to 2018. On November 9, 2022 the Sudbury Wolves announced that MacKenzie was named the team's 31st Head Coach.

Playing career

Amateur
MacKenzie began his junior career playing for his hometown Sudbury Wolves of the Ontario Hockey League (OHL). Following his second season, in which he increased his point production from 20 to 87, he was drafted by the Atlanta Thrashers in the fifth round, 128 overall, in the 1999 National Hockey League (NHL) entry draft. In his final season, he registered 40 goals and 89 points leading the Wolves in points and finishing sixth in the OHL. He also finished with a face-off winning percent of 67%, winning both the OHL and Canadian Hockey League (CHL) Face-off Awards.

Professional

Atlanta Thrashers
Following his final season with Sudbury, MacKenzie joined the Thrashers' American Hockey League (AHL) affiliate, the Chicago Wolves. He registered 13 goals and 25 points. He also made his NHL debut for the Thrashers during the season, against the Columbus Blue Jackets on April 12, 2002. By season's end, the Wolves finished with 86 points and qualified for the playoffs. In the playoffs, MacKenzie helped the Wolves win their first Calder Cup championship. Over the next three seasons, MacKenzie played mainly with the Wolves, helping them back to the Calder Cup finals in 2005. The following season, he was named team captain. In the opening minutes of his first home game as captain, MacKenzie crashed into the opposing team's net and broke his ankle. He returned later in the season and helped the Wolves to the franchise's 500th win. In the game, MacKenzie scored his third career hat-trick in the 7–3 victory over the Omaha Ak-Sar-Ben Knights. He finished the season playing 36 games and registering 10 goals and 22 points, while the Wolves finished with 86 points and missed the playoffs for the first time in franchise history. MacKenzie spent one more season in the Thrashers system before becoming a free agent. He finished his Thrashers career with 2 assists and 20 penalty minutes (PIMs) in 28 NHL games, and 377 games played, 83 goals, and 184 points for Chicago. He also set a franchise record for shorthanded goals with 21.

Columbus Blue Jackets
In the off-season, MacKenzie was signed by the Columbus Blue Jackets to one-year, two-way contract. He began the season in the AHL playing for the Syracuse Crunch. He made his Blue Jackets debut on December 10, 2007, against the Anaheim Ducks; he was reassigned to Syracuse the following day. Later in the season, he was re-called and scored his first career NHL goal against Mike Smith in a game against the Tampa Bay Lightning. At the end of the season, Columbus re-signed MacKenzie to a two-year contract. He continued to split time between Columbus and Syracuse until the 2010–11 season. During his time in Syracuse, he set the Crunch team record with 11 career shorthanded goals. He established himself as an NHL regular in 2010–11 and finished the season with career highs in goals (9), assists (14), points (23) and plus-minus rating. His +14 was the highest for a forward and third-highest total in Blue Jackets history. After establishing himself, MacKenzie became a fixture on the Blue Jackets' fourth line and an integral part of their penalty kill. The following season, he spent the entire year with the Blue Jackets. Towards the end of the season, MacKenzie suffered a concussion and missed the final 16 games of the season. He finished with 7 goals and 14 points in a career-high 66 games while leading the Blue Jackets with a +4 rating. After passing an off-season physical, due to concussion concerns, Columbus re-signed MacKenzie to a two-year deal.

Florida Panthers
On July 1, 2014, MacKenzie signed a three-year contract as a free agent with the Florida Panthers. Two years later, on October 9, 2016, he was named the ninth captain in Panthers' history. On September 17, 2018, he was removed as captain and replaced by Aleksander Barkov. After playing only one game that season, he retired in the offseason and was named an assistant coach for the Panthers on June 4, 2019.

International play 
Internationally, MacKenzie represented Canada at the 2001 World Junior Ice Hockey Championships. He registered a goal and three points in seven games. He also won 58.1% of his face-offs, the eight-highest percentage in the tournament. In group play, Canada went 2–1–1 to finish third in Group B. In the playoff round, Canada defeated the United States 2–1 before losing to Finland in the semi-final. Following the loss, Canada played Sweden in the bronze medal game, winning 2–1 and earning MacKenzie his lone international medal.

Personal
MacKenzie is married with two children. His father, Ken MacKenzie, is the assistant general manager of the OHL's Sudbury Wolves. Mackenzie is also good friends with former NHL forward Mike Fisher, whom he played with in Sudbury.

Career statistics

Regular season and playoffs

International

References

External links
 

1981 births
Living people
Atlanta Thrashers draft picks
Atlanta Thrashers players
Canadian ice hockey centres
Chicago Wolves players
Columbus Blue Jackets players
Florida Panthers players
Ice hockey people from Ontario
Sportspeople from Greater Sudbury
Sudbury Wolves players
Syracuse Crunch players
Florida Panthers coaches